

The First Buddhist council was a gathering of senior monks of the Buddhist order convened just after Gautama Buddha's death, which according to Buddhist tradition was c. 483 BCE, though most modern scholars place it around 400 BCE.  The story of the gathering is recorded in the Vinaya Pitaka of the Theravadins. It is regarded as canonical by all schools of Buddhism, but in the absence of evidence from outside the Buddhist sutras some scholars have expressed doubts as to the event's historicity. However, the lack of written record is a common challenge in any research into Historiography of India, as there are very few known text recording India history before the 15th century.

Description
A council of 500 Arahants was held at Rajgir three months following the Buddha's death to agree on the contents of the Dhamma and Vinaya. It is said that following the Buddha's death, 499 of the Buddha's top arahats were chosen to attend the council, with one seat reserved for Ananda, then a sotapanna. As the meeting approached, Ananda trained himself until the dawn of day of the council. When the dawn arrived, he decided to lie down, and before his head hit the pillow, he became an arahant.

The meeting was led by Mahakasyapa under the patronage of the king Ajātasattu. Its objective was to preserve the Buddha's sayings (suttas) and the monastic discipline or rules (Vinaya). Even though the Buddha allowed the Sangha to abolish the minor rules, the Sangha made the unanimous decision to keep all the rules of the Vinaya. Ananda recited the Suttas, such that each begins: 'Thus have I heard' (Pali: Evaṃ me sutaṃ). The monk Upali (Sanskrit उपालि upāli) recited the Vinaya.

Regarding the Abhidhamma Pitaka, the third major division of the Tipitaka, Western scholarship has suggested that the Abhidhamma Pitaka was likely composed starting around 300 BCE because of its contents and differences in language and style. According to Theravada tradition maintained by the Atthakathā-teachers responsible for its memorization, the six canons of Abhidhamma Pitaka, one of its Matika, and the ancient Atthakathā (commentary) were also included at the first Buddhist council in the Sutta category, but its literature is different from Sutta because the Abhidhamma Pitaka was authored by Sāriputta.

Historicity
Tradition states that the First Council lasted for seven months. Scholars doubt, however, whether the entire canon was really recited during the First Council, because the early texts contain different accounts on important subjects such as meditation. It may be, though, that early versions were recited of what is now known as the Vinaya-piṭaka and Sutta-piṭaka. Nevertheless, many scholars, from the late 19th century onward, have considered the historicity of the First Council improbable. Some scholars, such as orientalists Louis de La Vallée-Poussin and D.P. Minayeff, thought there must have been assemblies after the Buddha's death, but considered only the main characters and some events before or after the First Council historical. Other scholars, such as Buddhologist André Bareau and Indologist Hermann Oldenberg, considered it likely that the account of the First Council was written after the Second Council, and based on that of the second, since there were not any major problems to solve after the Buddha's death, or any other need to organize the First Council. On the other hand, archaeologist Louis Finot, Indologist E. E. Obermiller and to some extent Indologist Nalinaksha Dutt thought the account of the First Council was authentic, because of the correspondences between the Pāli texts and the Sanskrit traditions. Indologist Richard Gombrich, following Bhikkhu Sujato and Bhikkhu Brahmali's arguments, states that "it makes good sense to believe ... that large parts of the Pali Canon do preserve for us the Buddha-vacana, 'the Buddha's words', transmitted to us via his disciple Ānanda and the First Council".

Sources
All six of the surviving Vinaya traditions contain accounts, in whole or in part, of the first and second councils and are in agreement regarding their particulars. The story of the First Council seems to be a continuation of the story of the Buddha's final days and death told in the Mahaparinibbana Sutta and its equivalents in the Agamas. Based on correlations and continuity between these two texts, Louis Finot concluded that they had originated from a single narrative that was later split between the Sutta Pitaka and Vinaya Pitaka. In most schools, the account of the First Council is located at the end of the Skandhaka section of the Vinaya but before any appendices.

See also
Buddhist councils
Second Buddhist Council
Third Buddhist council
Fourth Buddhist council
Fifth Buddhist council
Sixth Buddhist council

References

Bibliography

External links
 Recitation of the Five Hundred (English translation) - The traditional story of the First Council, as recorded in the Pali Canon.

Buddhist council1
Buddhist councils
540s BC
6th century BC in religion
6th-century BC establishments